Cazeneuve is a commune in the Gers department in southwestern France.

Since 2015, the commune is a part of the Canton of Armagnac-Ténarèze.

In the neighbourhood are numerous old castles, little medieval walled villages, small cities built around castles and "sacred" places, because the Via Podiensis and the Way of St. James of Compostela are going through the Montréal and left their traces.

Geography

Population

See also
Communes of the Gers department

References

Communes of Gers